Smart Woman is a 1931 pre-Code comedy-romance and drama film directed by Gregory La Cava and starring Mary Astor, Robert Ames, and John Halliday.

Plot
Mrs. Nancy Gibson (Mary Astor) sets out to regain the affections of her cheating husband Donald Gibson (Robert Ames), after she returns from a trip to Paris, where she had to look after her sick mother.
To welcome her in her beautiful house are her servants and husband and wife Billy (Edward Everett Horton) and Sally Ross (Ruth Weston) — Don's business partner and Don's sister. Nancy learns that Don is with his mistress, Peggy Preston (Noel Francis), who very often is accompanied by her mother Mrs. Preston (Gladys Gale). Nancy has the affection of the Rosses and her servants, but she is at first very shocked. Then she decides to play the modern wife and invites Peggy Preston and her mother for the weekend in her house as her guests. Pretending she herself has fallen for Sir Guy Harrington (John Halliday), a man she met in Europe (in fact she met him on the ship on the way home), she invites him too, hoping his flirtation will help her to gain back her husband, whom she still loves.

Cast
 Mary Astor as Mrs. Nancy Gibson
 Robert Ames as Donald Gibson
 John Halliday as Sir Guy Harrington
 Edward Everett Horton as Billy Ross
 Ruth Weston as Mrs. Sally Gibson Ross
 Noel Francis as Peggy Preston
 Gladys Gale as Mrs. Preston
 Alfred Cross as Brooks the Butler
 Lillian Harmer as Mrs. Windleweaver
 Bill Elliott as Reporter on Ship (uncredited)
 Harold Miller	as Deck Lounger (uncredited)
 Dennis O'Keefe as Passenger Departing Ship (uncredited)
 Pearl Varvalle as Helen, Gibson's maid (uncredited)

Reception
In his New York Times review, critic Mordaunt Hall called Smart Woman a "neat diversion"..."spoken [sic] by competent players and Gregory La Cava has directed it with a keen eye on its none too rugged story."

References

External links
 
 
 
 

American romantic comedy-drama films
American black-and-white films
American films based on plays
Films directed by Gregory La Cava
1930s romantic comedy-drama films
1931 comedy films
1931 drama films
1931 films
1930s American films